Christian Witkin (American, born October 15, 1966 in Manchester, England) is a New York based fashion and portrait photographer. He is well known for capturing revealing moments of celebrities - including President Barack Obama, Meredith Vieira, Steve Jobs, Lil' Kim, Quentin Tarantino, Foxy Brown, and Christopher Hitchens - as well as for his extensive campaigns for Gap Inc., Vanity Fair, and People. His work is described as "iconic, beautiful portraiture defined by a refined yet approachable point of view."

Career 
Born to a Dutch mother and an American father in Manchester, Witkin was raised in Amsterdam, The Netherlands. During his childhood he was exposed to a wide range of art and culture by his painter father which inspired him to become a photographer. He relocated to New York in 1984 to study photography at Syracuse University, after which he moved to New York City, where he began working with Peter Lindbergh, Bruce Weber, and Annie Leibovitz.

In 1993, Witkin was introduced to George Pitts - a photo editor at the then new Vibe Magazine - which launched his professional career. During his time at Vibe, Witkin would score critical success and recognition for his work which included capturing Quincy Jones, 50 Cent, Nas, Eve, Rakim, and numerous other stars in a style that combined intimate portraiture with blazing glamour. Concurrent with this work, a series of street portraits commissioned by New York Magazine would also attract major plaudits leading to a long association with the organization and entry to working with the most exclusive magazines in the world. In 1996, New York Times Magazine would honour him in its list of the world's leading photographers, 100 Years of Pictures; WHO'S WHO.

Cultivating a working relationship with Gary Koepke led Witkin to pitching Gap Inc. his concept for a new marketing campaign featuring rising and iconic stars. This concept was embraced and implemented at Witkin's studio in Manhattan's Meat Packing District, photographing under a large skylight into a three walled "room" with old planked floors. Met with great popular acclaim, this approach would define Gap's marketing slant for the next eight years. Participating stars in this campaign included Danny Glover, Nathan Lane, Sarah Jessica Parker, Scarlett Johansson, Anjelica Huston, Don Cheadle, Rosanna Arquette with Patricia Arquette, and Tatum O'Neal with Ryan O'Neal. In addition to his work with Hollywood celebrities, Witkin has worked extensively with dancers and dance companies including, Stephen Petronio, Merce Cunningham Dance Company, Paul Taylor Dance Company, American Ballet Theatre, The Royal Ballet, and New York City Ballet.

His work has appeared in most major magazines including: Vogue (American, British, German, Spanish and Japanese editions), Elle, O, The Oprah Magazine, W, Harper's Bazaar, Slate, Vanity Fair, The New York Times, The New York Times Magazine, Interview Magazine, Wall Street Journal, NY Magazine, People Magazine, Women's Health, The London Sunday Times, Arena, and i-D. His advertising clients include Gucci, Gap, Nike, IBM, American Express, Microsoft, Philips, Calvin Klein, and Shinola. His portrait commission list is a versatile constellation of stars including: Snoop Dogg, Diane von Fürstenberg, Bruce Willis, Martha Stewart, Chaka Khan, Javier Bardem, Padma Lakshmi, Matt Damon, Gabourey Sidibe, Christian Bale, Beverly Johnson, LL Cool J, Michael Douglas with Kirk Douglas, The Olsen Twins, Lenny Kravitz, Julia Stiles, Ashton Kutcher, Chloë Sevigny, Marilyn Manson, and Gloria Steinem.

Much of Witkin's distinctive style has been developed during his travels throughout the world - specifically India, Thailand, and Ethiopia - and his willingness to "take himself outside of his comfort zone." For his commercial work, Witkin shoots digitally, while preferring film of different formats - 8x10, 4x5, and Rolleiflex; 6x6 - for studio work. His oeuvre has been shown in numerous exhibits and museums internationally and - in addition to being collected in numerous catalogs - has been published in a number of books. Witkin is preparing several bodies of work into monographs, notably "Ordinary Beauty" a book dedicated to female beauty in the form of nudes, portraits and fragments.

Personal life 
Witkin's father, award-winning American figurative painter and art professor Jerome Witkin, and uncle, American photographer Joel-Peter Witkin, are identical twins. Witkin has a daughter, India Witkin (b.1996). A longtime resident of New York, he relocated to Los Angeles, CA in March 2018.

References

External links 
 Christian Witkin - Official website
 

1966 births
Living people
Photographers from Amsterdam
Dutch emigrants to the United States
Photographers from New York City